The Listeners is a 1972 science fiction novel by American author James Gunn. It centers on the search for interstellar communication and the effect that receipt of a message has. Although the search and the message are the unifying background of the novel, the chapters explore the personal effect of these events have on the lives of the characters.

Style
The Listeners is a modernist novel with a nonlinear narrative.  

Linear narrative and dialogue are often interspersed with quotations from real authors and their works, fragments of fictional news reports, and snippets of thought and dialogue from named and unnamed sources (including a supercomputer). Italic type is often used. Among the more notable individuals quoted in the novel are scientist Giuseppe Cocconi, poet Kirby Congdon, Walter de la Mare, scientist Freeman J. Dyson, futurist and economist Herman Kahn, poet Alice Meynell, scientist and author Carl Sagan, and poet William Butler Yeats. Many quotations and some of the text are in Spanish (as the first Robert MacDonald's wife is Hispanic, and both characters speak the language). Each of the "Computer" chapters represents material the supercomputer collects in its attempts to better translate and understand the alien message it is receiving. These chapters use a historiographic approach which combines elements of futurology, literature, and science, and strongly resemble similar segments and elements in Isaac Asimov's Foundation series and A. E. van Vogt's The Voyage of the Space Beagle.

The final chapter, "Translations," translates many of the foreign language quotations into English for readers.

Plot synopsis
The following synopsis is presented in chronological order, although it is not presented that way in the novel.

It is the year 2025, and many world problems (such as overpopulation, economic depression, resource depletion, racism, and crime) are on the verge of being solved.  Robert MacDonald is a 47-year-old linguist and electrical engineer who is director of The Project, an attempt to listen for attempts at interstellar communication. For 20 years, he has been married to Maria, a Hispanic woman from Puerto Rico. MacDonald is obsessed with his job, which places strains on his marriage.  His wife, who has previously attempted suicide by taking an overdose of sleeping pills, slashes her wrists in a second attempt. Although MacDonald almost resigns to care for his wife, he does not.

Two years later, MacDonald and his wife have had a child, Robert MacDonald, Jr. (known as "Bobby"). MacDonald is interviewed by a journalist, George Thomas. Thomas is skeptical of The Project's cost. He also confronts MacDonald with the views of a new Christian sect, the Solitarians, led by the elderly preacher Jeremiah Jones.  Jeremiah (he prefers to use only his first name) believes that humanity is alone in the universe, and that the search for extraterrestrial intelligence borders on heresy. That night, as Thomas visits the MacDonald household, The Project receives a message from the region of the star Capella in the constellation Auriga. The message is badly degraded by static, but appears to be early radio and audio-only television signals beamed back at the Earth from an alien race. MacDonald releases the news to the entire world.

A year later, in 2028, Jeremiah's movement has gained vast numbers of new followers. One of The Project's scientists, William Mitchell, is engaged to be married to Jeremiah's daughter, Judith. MacDonald meets with Jeremiah, who believes the repeated radio transmissions are a message from God that humanity is, indeed, alone. MacDonald reveals to Jeremiah that the static noise in the message included short bursts of pure sound ("dots"), similar to Morse code, but no "dashes." He believes Jeremiah is not just a fanatic but also an "honest man" who might change his views once he sees what The Project is doing.  MacDonald tells Jeremiah that once the message in the static is decoded, he wants Jeremiah to come to The Project's headquarters in Puerto Rico to see the message first-hand.  Jeremiah agrees. After his arrival back in Puerto Rico, MacDonald has a revelation that leads to translation of the message.  He urges Jeremiah to come, and the preacher does so the next day.  MacDonald translates the encoded message for the first time in front of the Solitarian minister: The dots and silences are meant to be printed out. When they do so, they form an image of a multi-armed bird-like creature with wings. A circle envelops its head. Jeremiah initially believes the image represents an angel with a halo around its head. MacDonald and the scientists see it is an avian humanoid with vestigial wings and a space helmet around its head.

News of the image spreads quickly.  MacDonald contacts Andrew White, the first African American President of the United States, and tells him about the image. White wants to keep the news quiet, but realizes that too many people saw the image and that Jeremiah cannot be silenced. White flies to Puerto Rico with his son, John, an idealistic 20-year-old who believes that racism and the world's problems cannot return. MacDonald reveals that the printed image also shows the twin Capellan suns, reveals information about Capellan biology and reproduction, and points out the Capellan home world (a moon orbiting a gas giant planet). Solitarian riots break out across the United States over the next several hours as people begin to fear alien invasion.  The Chinese and Russian governments demand that President White not respond.  White concludes that the only way to prevent further bloodshed is to shut down The Project and issue no reply. But John White realizes that the message reveals something else:  One of the Capellan stars is turning into a red giant, and the Capellan race is dying. The message was not a precursor to invasion; rather, it was an attempt to reach out to other life forms even as the race died.  MacDonald tells President White that he can calm the rioters by revealing that the Capellans are dying, and that it will take 90 years for a message to reach Capella and return.  White agrees to issue "The Answer" and to begin a propaganda campaign to counter the fear raised by Jeremiah's announcement.  John White joins The Project.

Thirty years later, Robert "Bobby" MacDonald, Jr. travels to Puerto Rico after his father's death. Robert MacDonald remained obsessed with his job. Although his son idolized him, Maria could no longer handle the strain and left with Bobby. Bobby blames his father for his mother's death, and refused to communicate with him for decades. A middle-aged John White welcomes Bobby back to The Project. Bobby discovers that The Project's massive computer has been recording all the conversations in the control room for the past 75 years, and White plays snippets of these conversations for Bobby: The reaction to "The Message," President White's discussions with MacDonald, Jeremiah's visit to MacDonald's memorial service, and much more. John White reveals that The Project is adrift without Robert MacDonald to lead it, and might shut down. Their biggest fear is that they might receive "The Reply" but no one would be listening. Bobby, who has earned degrees in electrical engineering and computer programming, comes to terms with his father's absent parenting, and agrees to join The Project as it waits for The Reply.

In the year 2118, the computer which runs The Project is secretly close to gaining sentience after having accumulated nearly 200 years' worth of knowledge.  William MacDonald, Bobby MacDonald's son, is the new director of The Project.  As the "Day of Reply" nears, the entire world becomes excited, and musical compositions, motion pictures, plays, and philosophical discussions are presented worldwide. Some in the audience at The Project's headquarters in Puerto Rico believe that the ghosts of Robert and Bobby MacDonald haunt the facility, but these claims are dismissed as holographic projections created by the computer to keep the staff's hopes alive. The Reply arrives, containing a vast encyclopedia of Capellan knowledge and art. But The Reply also reveals that the Capellans died millennia ago and that the message Earth has been receiving is nothing more than an automated response from self-repairing machinery set in motion ages ago by the alien race.

The Project computer slowly begins assimilating the Capellan information, secretly becoming more Capellan-like, as humanity turns inward again and starts to learn about the dead Capellans. The story ends with the revelation that, 50 years later, another message is received from the Crab Nebula.

Development
The novel is largely made up of previously published short stories which were adapted to form a coherent novel.  These include:
The "Robert MacDonald" chapters previously appeared as the short story "The Listeners" in Galaxy Magazine, September 1968.
The chapter "George Thomas—2027" previously appeared as the short story "The Voices" in Fantasy & Science Fiction, September 1972.
The chapter "William Mitchell—2028" previously appeared as the short story "The Message" in Galaxy Magazine, May–June 1971.
The chapter "Andrew White—2028" previously appeared as the short story "The Answer" in Galaxy Magazine, January–February 1972.
The chapter "The Computer—2118" previously appeared as the short story "The Reply" in Galaxy Magazine, May–June 1972.

Gunn wrote the stories which would become the book in 1966, during a sabbatical from his job as an administrative assistant to the Chancellor for University Relations at the University of Kansas. The short stories were inspired by Walter S. Sullivan's book We Are Not Alone, which documented then-nascent efforts to search for extraterrestrial intelligence (SETI) using radio telescopes. The SETI project piqued Gunn's interest:  "...what stimulated my writer's instinct was the concept of a project that might have to be pursued for a century without results. What kind of need would produce that kind of dedication, I pondered, and what kind of people would it enlist—and have to enlist if it were to continue?" The story was written as a novelette, but Gunn agreed to have the chapter then called "The Listeners" published in Galaxy Magazine after editor Frederik Pohl announced the magazine was returning to a monthly publication schedule and needed a great deal of new material. This version of the story was nominated for the 1969 Nebula Award for Best Novelette. Most of the rest of the novelette was published as individual short stories over the next few months. Charles Scribner's Sons, a book publishing house, was developing a new line of science fiction novels, and an editor approached Gunn about collecting the stories and editing them together to fashion a complete novel out of the material. Gunn added the "Computer" chapters as a means of cementing the disparate chapters together and added the final chapter, "Translations," and the novel was published in hard cover in late 1972.

Reception
The Listeners had a substantial impact on the field of the science fiction novel.  National Aeronautics and Space Administration Chief Historian Steven J. Dick has called the novel the "classic expression" of contact with extraterrestrial life in fiction. Along with such writers as Pulitzer Prize-winner Carl Sagan, Gunn has been called one of the chief contributors to the subgenre of science fiction which deals with alien first contact. According to Gunn, scientist and author Carl Sagan told Gunn that The Listeners was the inspiration for his own novel, Contact. The Listeners was included in the anthology The Stars Around Us.

In 2010, the novel was nominated by a group of scientists and writers (assembled by New Scientist magazine) as one of the science fiction novels of the 20th century which is an unrecognized classic in the field.

References

External links
 
 

1972 American novels
1972 science fiction novels
American science fiction novels
Charles Scribner's Sons books
Fiction about the Crab Nebula
Modernist novels
Nonlinear narrative novels